Farahnaz (from Arabic فرح (faraḥ) meaning joy, gladness and Persian ناز (nâz) meaning cute) is a Persian given name for girls common in Iran, South Asia and Central Asia. People with this name include:

Given name
 Farahnaz Forotan (born 1992), Afghan journalist.
 Farahnaz Ispahani, Pakistani American writer and former politician
 Farahnaz Pahlavi (born 1963), Pahlavi princess

See also
Farah (name)
Naz (name)

Persian feminine given names
Urdu feminine given names